Mike Streicher (January 9, 1957 – November 6, 2019) was an American auto racing driver from Findlay, Ohio.  He was the United States Automobile Club National Midget Champion of 1991 when he fielded the Streicher #8. Together with Bobby Seymour and Seymour Enterprises of Marlboro, Massachusetts, he built the first and later manufactured the Hawk brand Midget and Quarter Midget cars. He was also a teacher at University of Northwestern Ohio in their High Performance program. In 2018, Streicher was inducted into the National Midget Auto Racing Hall of Fame.

References 

1957 births
2019 deaths
People from Findlay, Ohio
American racing drivers